Again is the fifth extended play by South Korean girl group T-ara, It was released on October 10, 2013 by Core Contents Media. It marked their first release with the original line-up following member Lee Areum’s departure from the group.

Background and release

Again 
On October 6, 2013, T-ara announced the impending release of double lead singles to promote their upcoming EP, Again. The album was released digitally on October 10, including the singles "Number 9" (넘버나인) and "Because I Know" (느낌 아니까; Neukkim Anikka) and their music videos. "Number 9" is an electro-pop dance song with sad lyrics and melody. It was choreographed by Yama & Hotchicks, who also choreographed "Bo Peep Bo Peep". "Because I Know" is a mid-tempo song with an acoustic feel.

Again 1977 
A repackaged edition of the EP, Again 1977, was released on December 4, 2013.  It contains two new songs, "Again 1977" and "Do You Know Me", a remake of Sand Pebbles' 1977 hit, "What Should I Do".

White Winter 
The EP was re-released as special album on December 14, 2013 titled White Winter with additions two Christmas songs, "Hide and Seek" and "Middle of Winter Hide and Seek".

In 2016, Chinese girl group "Miss Mass" released a remake version of the song in Chinese.

Commercial performance 
Shortly after its release, "Number Nine" reached number one on multiple real-time charts.

Again reached number 2 on the South Korean Gaon Weekly Albums Chart and number 45 on Japan's Oricon Weekly Albums Chart as a Korean import.  The single "Number 9" reached number 5 on the Gaon Weekly Digital Chart and number 4 on Billboard's Korea K-Pop Hot 100. "Because I Know" charted at numbers 41 and 21 on the Gaon and Billboard charts, respectively.

Track listing

Again 1977

White Winter

Charts

Again

Singles chart history

Other charted songs

Sales

Accolades

Awards and nominations

Rankings

Release history

References 

2013 EPs
T-ara albums
Genie Music EPs
Korean-language EPs